You Jih-cheng (15 May 1949 – 25 May 2002) was a Taiwanese politician who served as the mayor of Longtan District in Taoyuan City and was elected as the second legislator in Taoyuan County on behalf of the Kuomintang party. He was killed in the crash of China Airlines Flight 611 on 25 May 2002. The Boeing 747 operating the flight broke apart in mid-air near Magong, Penghu. All 225 people on board including You were killed and he was among the 50 bodies that never been found or identified.

References 

Victims of aviation accidents or incidents in Taiwan
Affiliated Senior High School of National Taiwan Normal University alumni
Kuomintang Members of the Legislative Yuan in Taiwan
Members of the 2nd Legislative Yuan
1949 births
2002 deaths
Taoyuan City Members of the Legislative Yuan
Mayors of places in Taiwan
National Taiwan University alumni
Victims of aviation accidents or incidents in 2002